Clubul Sportiv Phoenix Constanța, commonly known as Phoenix Constanța, is a Romanian women's basketball club based in Constanța, currently participates in the Liga Națională, the top-tier league in Romania.

The club initially played in the second-tier Liga I. However, in 2018 the league was merged with the top-tier Liga Națională.

Current roster

References

External links
 CS Phoenix Constanța. at totalbaschet.ro

Basketball teams in Romania
Women's basketball teams in Romania
Basketball teams established in 2008
2008 establishments in Romania